The 2014 FIBA Americas Under-18 Championship for Women was an international basketball competition that took place in Colorado Springs, Colorado, United States from August 6–10, 2014. It was the tenth edition of the championship, and was the FIBA Americas qualifying tournament for the 2015 FIBA Under-19 World Championship for Women. Eight national teams from across the Americas, composed of women aged 19 and under, competed in the tournament. The United States won their seventh consecutive gold in this event by beating Canada in the final, 104–74.

Venues
United States Olympic Training Center, Colorado Springs

Standings

Group A

Group B

Final round

Classification 5–8

Semifinals

Final classification games

Seventh place game

Fifth place game

Bronze medal game

Final

Awards

Final ranking

References

External links
FIBA Americas U-18 Championship for Women

FIBA Americas Under-18 Championship for Women
2014 in women's basketball
2014 in American women's basketball
International women's basketball competitions hosted by the United States
2014–15 in North American basketball
2014–15 in South American basketball